Steve Kavanagh (born in Oakville, Ontario) is a Canadian former competitive ice dancer. With Janet Emerson, he is the 1993 Penta Cup silver medalist and a two-time Canadian national bronze medalist (1995 and 1996). They competed together at two Champions Series (Grand Prix) events – 1995 Skate America and 1995 Trophée de France. Kavanagh also competed with Danielle Ballagh and Christine Fuller.

Competitive highlights 
GP: Champions Series (Grand Prix)

With Fuller

With Emerson

With Ballagh

References 

Canadian male ice dancers
Living people
Year of birth missing (living people)
20th-century Canadian people